Mehdi Ouertani (born 17 June 1990) is a Tunisian footballer who plays for USM Bel Abbès in the Algerian Ligue Professionnelle 1.

Mehdi Ouertani has also the Algerian nationality from his mother, He is considered as a local player from the Algerian league.

References

External links

Living people
1990 births
Tunisian footballers
Tunisian expatriate footballers
Expatriate footballers in Algeria
CA Bizertin players
Stade Tunisien players
AS Marsa players
Olympique Béja players
JS Kairouan players
NA Hussein Dey players
US Ben Guerdane players
MC Alger players
ES Métlaoui players
USM Bel Abbès players
Association football defenders